The following is a timeline of the history of Brighton, England.

18th century

19th century

20th century

21st century

References

History of Brighton and Hove
Brighton